Striatosedulia is  a genus of grasshoppers in the family Acrididae, subfamily Catantopinae, found in Indo-China.

Species
The Orthoptera Species File lists:
 Striatosedulia beybienkoi Storozhenko, 2005 (Thailand)
 Striatosedulia cattiensis Dawwrueng, Storozhenko & Asanok, 2015 (Vietnam)
 Striatosedulia ingrishi Storozhenko, 1992 (Vietnam)
 Striatosedulia pluvisilvatica Ingrisch, 1989 - type species (Thailand)
 Striatosedulia pooae Tan, Dawwrueng & Artchawakom, 2017 (Thailand)

References

External links 
 
 

Acrididae genera
Orthoptera of Indo-China